Sitakunda massacre refers to the massacre of Hindu pilgrims on 15 February 1950. The Hindu pilgrims from all over East Bengal, Tripura and Assam were on their way to Sitakunda on the occasion of Maha Shivaratri at the Chandranath temple. The pilgrims were attacked by the Ansars and armed Muslim mobs and massacred at the Sitakunda railway station.

Background 

In 1950, the Shivaratri fell on 15 February 1950. Many of the pilgrims had set out for Sitakunda well in advance. However, on 10 February loot, arson, abduction, forcible conversion and wholesale massacre of Hindus started in East Bengal. Violence erupted in Chittagong on 12 February. The Hindus of Chittagong asked the local authorities to abandon the fair in view of the anti-Hindu activities of the Ansars. The District Judge who was the ex officio President of the Shrine Committee was non-committal. The Divisional Commissioner of Chittagong Division however assured necessary police precautions and asked to continue with the fair.

Events 
Meanwhile, as the violence erupted in Chittagong on 12 February, the Hindu pilgrims who had arrived in Chittagong were assaulted. On the evening of 14th, the pilgrims who left Chittagong for Sitakunda went missing. On the 15th morning, another batch of pilgrims arrived in Sitakunda from Chittagong by train. When the train reached Sitakunda they were attacked. The pilgrims were attacked in the railway station and within the train compartments and brutally massacred. Similarly all the up and down trains to and from Sitakunda were looted and the Hindu passengers killed. One eyewitness counted 25 dead bodies along the tracks at the Sitakunda railway station. Many houses near the Sitakunda railway station were set on fire.

See also 
Chandranath Temple
Shakti Peethas

References 

Mass murder in 1950
Massacres in Pakistan
History of East Pakistan
1950 in East Pakistan
Massacres of Bengali Hindus in East Pakistan
Government of Liaquat Ali Khan
February 1950 events in Asia
Massacres in 1950